Maroubra is a genus of pipefishes with one species, M. perserrata, endemic to Australia and the other, M. yasudai, endemic to Japan.

Species
The currently recognized species in this genus are:
 Maroubra perserrata Whitley, 1948 (sawtooth pipefish)
 Maroubra yasudai C. E. Dawson, 1983 (orange pipefish)

References

Syngnathidae
Marine fish genera
Taxa named by Gilbert Percy Whitley